Tenali was Lok Sabha constituency of Andhra Pradesh till 2008.

Members of Parliament

Election results

2004

See also
 Tenali
 List of Constituencies of the Lok Sabha

References

Former Lok Sabha constituencies of Andhra Pradesh
Former constituencies of the Lok Sabha
2008 disestablishments in India
Constituencies disestablished in 2008